Asif Kapadia (born 1972) is a British filmmaker.

Academy Award, BAFTA and Grammy winning director Asif Kapadia has made his name directing visually striking films exploring ‘outsiders’, characters living in extreme circumstances, fighting against a corrupt or broken system. He has worked in drama and documentaries, Kapadia is best known for his trilogy of narratively driven, archive constructed documentaries Senna, Amy and Diego Maradona.

Amy (2015), based on singer Amy Winehouse, had its world premiere at the 2015 Cannes Film Festival and it is the highest grossing British Documentary of all time at the UK box office. It also won the Academy Award for Best Documentary Feature, the BAFTA for Best Documentary, a Grammy for Best Music Film, the European Film Award for Best Documentary and the Grierson Award for Best Documentary.

Kapadia directed the documentary film Senna (2010), based on Ayrton Senna (famous for his achievements in motor racing), which won the BAFTA Award for Best Documentary, the BAFTA Award for Best Editing and the World Cinema Audience Award Documentary at the Sundance Film Festival 2011. Senna was nominated for Outstanding British Film of the Year.

Kapadia's narrative debut The Warrior (2001), won the BAFTA for Outstanding British Film of the Year and the Award for Special Achievement by a Director, Writer or Producer in their Debut Feature, the film was also nominated for Best Film Not in the English Language.

In 2019, he released the film Diego Maradona, based on Argentine football legend Diego Maradona, with Kapadia stating, "Maradona is the third part of a trilogy about child geniuses and fame."

In May 2021, he released the musical docuseries 1971: The Year That Music Changed Everything, based on the book 1971 – Never a Dull Moment: Rock's Golden Year, by the British music journalist David Hepworth.

Early life
Asif Kapadia was born in 1972 in north London, to an Indian Muslim British family. He attended Newport Film School (formerly part of the University of Wales, Newport, now the University of South Wales),
achieved a first-class degree (BA Hons) in Film, TV and Photographic Arts from the University of Westminster
and an MA (RCA) in Directing for Film and TV at the Royal College of Art.

Career
Kapadia's first feature film, The Warrior,  was shot in the Himalayas and the deserts of Rajasthan. The film caught the attention of The Arts Foundation who in 2001 awarded him a fellowship in Film Directing. Peter Bradshaw in The Guardian described The Warrior as possessing "mighty breadth" and "shimmering beauty"; the film was nominated for three BAFTA awards, winning two: the Alexander Korda Award for the outstanding British Film of the Year 2003 and The Carl Foreman Award for Special Achievement by a Director, Screenwriter or Producer in their First Feature. The Warrior also won the Grand Prix at the Dinard Film Festival, the Sutherland Award at the London Film Festival, the Evening Standard British Film Awards for the Most Promising Newcomer and the Douglas Hickox Award for Best Debut Film.

Far North premiered at the Venice Film Festival, based on a dark short story by Sara Maitland. Kapadia used the brutal arctic landscape to show how desperation and loneliness drives a woman to harm the person she loves. Kapadia's fourth feature, Senna, was the life story of Brazilian motor-racing champion, Ayrton Senna. Senna was the highest grossing British documentary of all time (£3.3m, $5.2m).

Kapadia's next film Amy was a documentary that depicted the life and death of British singer-songwriter Amy Winehouse. Amy was released on 3 July 2015 in the United Kingdom, New York and Los Angeles, and worldwide on 10 July. The film has been described as "heartbreaking", "awe-inspiring", "unmissable", "the best documentary of the year" and "a tragic masterpiece". The film has received 5 out of 5 ratings when it was reviewed at the 2015 Cannes Film Festival in May. The film has become the highest grossing British documentary, and second highest grossing documentary of all time in the United Kingdom, overtaking Kapadia's 2010 movie Senna.

In 2018, a documentary film titled Maradona, based on Argentine football legend Diego Maradona, was released. Following on from Senna and Amy, Kapadia states, "Maradona is the third part of a trilogy about child geniuses and fame." He added, "I was fascinated by his journey, wherever he went there were moments of incredible brilliance and drama. He was a leader, taking his teams to the very top, but also many lows in his career. He was always the little guy fighting against the system... and he was willing to do anything, to use all of his cunning and intelligence to win."

In 2019, Kapadia was awarded as Honorary Associate of London Film School.

Political views
In December 2019, along with 42 other leading cultural figures, Kapadia signed a letter endorsing the Labour Party under Jeremy Corbyn's leadership in the 2019 general election. The letter stated that "Labour's election manifesto under Jeremy Corbyn's leadership offers a transformative plan that prioritises the needs of people and the planet over private profit and the vested interests of a few."

Awards and nominations

Filmography

References

External links

1972 births
Living people
European Film Awards winners (people)
English film directors
English people of Indian descent
British Ismailis
Grammy Award winners
Alumni of the University of Wales, Newport
Directors of Best Documentary Feature Academy Award winners
Outstanding Debut by a British Writer, Director or Producer BAFTA Award winners
Collage filmmakers
English people of Gujarati descent
Khoja Ismailism